Noreuil is a commune in the Pas-de-Calais department in the Hauts-de-France region of France.

Geography

Population

History

World War One

In 1917 it was the location of fighting during World War I.  In early 1917, General John Gellibrand, acting commander of the 2nd Division, advanced as he suspected that the Germans were withdrawing. Gellibrand's advance began well but ended with a disastrous, ill-planned and ill-executed "unauthorised" attack on Noreuil.

On the morning of 2 April 1917, the village was attacked by the 50th and 51st Battalions, with the 49th and 52nd in support.  Danish-born Australian Private Jørgen Christian Jensen of the 50th Battalion was awarded the Victoria Cross for the part he played. A Distinguished Service Order (and his first of two) was awarded to then-Major Noel Medway LOUTIT, an original ANZAC, who 'relieved the pressure' during these operations by working his way partly around the enemy flank and inflicting significant effective opposition.  He continued in assisting and re-organising the front line under considerable hostile machine gun fire.

On 15 April 1917 the Germans launched a major counter-attack against the Australians at Lagnicourt-Marcel. Robert Smith, at his headquarters in a ruined house in Noreuil, about 1500 metres from Lagnicourt, directed the defeat of the German counter-attack.  For his efforts in that engagement Smith was awarded a bar to his Distinguished Service Order (DSO).

Noreuil is close to Bullecourt, the southern end of the battlefront for the Battle of Arras.

Noreuil Park in Albury, New South Wales, Australia, is named in dedication to the men of the 13th battery, 5th field artillery brigade.

Places of interest
 The twentieth century church of St.Brice, rebuilt after World War I
 The Commonwealth War Graves Commission Australian cemetery.

See also
Communes of the Pas-de-Calais department

References

External links

 The Australian CWGC cemetery

Communes of Pas-de-Calais
Battles of the Western Front (World War I)
Battles of World War I involving Australia
Battles of World War I involving Germany